Robert Baker Lawson (August 23, 1875 – October 28, 1952) was a Major League Baseball pitcher. In nine career games, he had a 2-4 record, with a 3.66 ERA. He batted and threw right-handed.

Lawson was born in Brookneal, Virginia and died in Durham, North Carolina.  He attended the University of North Carolina, where he also served as the head baseball coach in 1900, 1905, 1906, and 1910, and later as a professor at the University of North Carolina School of Medicine.

External links

1875 births
1952 deaths
Boston Beaneaters players
Baltimore Orioles (1901–02) players
Major League Baseball pitchers
Richmond Colts players
Trenton Tigers players
North Carolina Tar Heels baseball coaches
University of North Carolina at Chapel Hill faculty
Sportspeople from Lynchburg, Virginia
Baseball players from Virginia
People from Brookneal, Virginia